Sir Simon Russell Beale is an English actor of the stage and screen.

Beale has received various awards for his performances on stage including ten Laurence Olivier Award nominations for his performances on the London stage. He has won three awards for his performances in Volpone (1996), Candide (2000), and Uncle Vanya (2003). For his work on the Broadway stage he has received a Tony Award nomination for Best Actor in a Play for his performance as George in the Tom Stoppard play Jumpers in 2004. 

For his work in film he has received two British Academy Television Awards winning for Best Actor for A Dance to the Music of Time in 1998, and for Best Supporting Actor for The Hollow Crown: Henry IV, Parts I & II in 2013. For his work in film he won the British Independent Film Award for Best Supporting Actor for his performance as Lavrentiy Beria in Armando Iannucci's dark comedy The Death of Stalin (2017).

Major associations

BAFTA Awards

Tony Awards

Olivier Awards

Theatre

Drama Desk Awards

Drama League Awards

Evening Standard Awards

Critics' Circle Theatre Award

Outer Critics Circle Awards

Industry awards

British Independent Film Award

Broadcasting Press Guild Award

London Film Critics' Circle Award

Royal Television Society Award

References 

Beale, Simon Russell